The Para people, also known as the Para Naga, are a Tibeto-Burmese ethnic group inhabiting mostly in the Naga Self-Administered Zone in Myanmar. They are one of the major Naga peoples of Myanmar and mostly inhabit the area around Lay Shi Township.

References

Naga people
Ethnic groups in Myanmar